Suncheon Junction, shortly Suncheon JC, is a junction located in Seo-myeon, Suncheon, South Jeolla, South Korea. Namhae Expressway (No. 10) and Suncheon–Wanju Expressway (No. 27) meet here. The type of junction is deleted turbine.

Roads

History 
31 January 2011 : It opened with W. Namwon ~ Suncheon segment of Suncheon–Wanju Expressway

Location 
 Jeollanam-do
 Suncheon-si
 Seo-myeon
 Gusang-ri
 Apgok-ri

References 

Namhae Expressway
Suncheon–Wanju Expressway
Expressway junctions in South Korea
Suncheon